Glencoe was a place name used by Scottish immigrants to name several places in the world. It may also refer to:

Glen Coe, Lochaber, Highland, Scotland
Massacre of Glencoe, 1692
Glencoe, Highland, a village in the glen
Glencoe Lochan, a tract of forest near the village

Other places

Australia
Glencoe, New South Wales
Glencoe, Queensland, a locality in the Toowoomba Region
Glencoe, South Australia
Glencoe Station, in Queensland
Delamere Station (pastoral lease), in the Northern Territory, once known as Glencoe

Canada
Glencoe, Nova Scotia (disambiguation)
Glencoe, Ontario
Glencoe Island, Nunavut
Glencoe, Restigouche County, New Brunswick

New Zealand
Glencoe, New Zealand

South Africa
Glencoe, KwaZulu-Natal

United States
Glencoe, Alabama
Glencoe, California
Glencoe, Florida
Glencoe, Illinois
Glencoe station, a railroad station
The Glencoe (Indianapolis, Indiana), listed in the National Register of Historic Places (NRHP) in Center Township of Indianapolis, Indiana
Glencoe, Kentucky
Glencoe, Louisiana
Glencoe, Maryland
Glencoe (Glencoe, Maryland), listed in the NRHP in Maryland
Glencoe, Minnesota
Glencoe, Missouri
Glencoe (Newark, New Jersey), listed in the NRHP in New Jersey
Glencoe, New Mexico
Glencoe, North Carolina
Glencoe, Ohio
Glencoe, Oklahoma
Glencoe, Oregon
Glencoe (Radford, Virginia), listed in the NRHP in Virginia
Glencoe, Wisconsin, a town
Glencoe (community), Wisconsin, an unincorporated community

Other uses
Glencoe (play), an 1840 tragedy by Thomas Talfourd
Glencoe I, British Thoroughbred racehorse
Glencoe II, Australian Thoroughbred racehorse, won 1868 Melbourne Cup

See also
 Glencoe High School (disambiguation)
 Glynco, Georgia